Pleckstrin homology domain containing S1 is a protein that in humans is encoded by the PLEKHS1 gene.

References

Further reading